Webster "Mac" McDonald (January 1, 1900 – June 12, 1982) was an American baseball pitcher in the Negro leagues. He played from 1920 to 1940 with several teams.

In the 1928 to 1930 seasons, McDonald was scouted by and went to play for a white team in Minnesota, where he was often the only African American player on the team. Joining him in later seasons were Negro league players Hooks Foreman, and Dave Brown.

At age 52, McDonald received votes listing him on the 1952 Pittsburgh Courier player-voted poll of the Negro leagues' best players ever.

References

External links
 and Baseball-Reference Black Baseball stats and Seamheads
Obituary

1900 births
1982 deaths
Baltimore Black Sox players
Chicago American Giants players
Detroit Stars players
Hilldale Club players
Homestead Grays players
Philadelphia Stars players
St. Louis Stars (baseball) players
Washington Pilots players
Wilmington Potomacs players
Baseball players from Delaware
People from New Castle County, Delaware
20th-century African-American sportspeople
Baseball pitchers